Hapoel Hevel Modi'in is a professional basketball club based in Hevel Modi'in Regional Council of Israel. The team plays in the Israeli National League.

History
Hapoel Hevel Modi'in have played most of their years in Liga Alef, the fourth and lowest level tier in Israeli basketball, until the 2017–18 season, where they have qualified to the Liga Artzit as the Liga Alef champions. On June 11, 2017, They have appointed Pini Gershon as Hevel Modi'in new general manager. He has resigned from his position on August 8, 2019.

In the 2018–19 season, Hevel Modi'in have won the 2019 Liga Artzit championship title, earning a promotion to the Israeli National League for the first time in their history.

Current roster

Notable alumni
 Jimmy Hall (born 1994)

References

External links
Eurobasket profile
Safsal profile
Facebook page

Basketball teams in Israel